This is a list of the complete squads for the 2016 Six Nations Championship, an annual rugby union tournament contested by the national rugby teams of England, France, Ireland, Italy, Scotland and Wales. Ireland are the defending champions.

Note: Number of caps and players' ages are indicated as of 6 February 2016 – the tournament's opening day.

On 13 January, Eddie Jones named a 33-man squad for the 2016 Six Nations Championship.

Head coach:  Eddie Jones

Call-ups
On 24 January, Semesa Rokoduguni was called up as cover for Chris Ashton, who had been given a 10-week ban.

On 1 February, Kieran Brookes replaced Henry Thomas, who had been covering Brookes in the initial squad, after recovering from a pre-squad announcement injury.

On 22 February, Luther Burrell was added to the squad as an injury replacement for Ollie Devoto.

On 29 February, Dave Ewers and Manu Tuilagi were called up to the squad ahead of the final two rounds of the Championship.

On 6 March, Ed Slater was called up to the squad as injury cover for Courtney Lawes.

On 19 January, head coach Guy Novès named a 31-man squad for the 2016 Six Nations Championship.

Head coach:  Guy Novès

Call-ups
On 24 January, Marvin O'Connor was called up to the squad as injury cover for Benjamin Fall.

On 25 January, Baptiste Serin and Bernard Le Roux were added to the squad as injury cover for Morgan Parra and Sébastien Vahaamahina.

On 28 January, Vincent Pelo and Maxime Mermoz were added to the squad, with Mermoz acting as injury cover for Alexandre Dumoulin.

On 31 January, Wesley Fofana was ruled out of France's opening test against Italy due to injury, with Teddy Thomas being called up as cover.

On 7 February, Loann Goujon replaced Louis Picamoles haven suffered an injury in France's opening match against Italy.

On 21 February, Djibril Camara, David Smith and François Trinh-Duc were called up to the squad as injury cover for Teddy Thomas and Marvin O'Connor. However, later that day Smith was made ineligible to play for France haven played for the New Zealand sevens team.

On 3 March, Xavier Chiocci was called up to the squad ahead of the Scotland game in round 4.

On 20 January, Joe Schmidt announced his 35-man squad for Ireland.

Head Coach:  Joe Schmidt

Call-ups
On 25 January, Finlay Bealham joined the squad as an injury replacement for Martin Moore who suffered a ham-string injury.

On 9 February, Fergus McFadden was called up as injury cover for Keith Earls who sustained an injury in the opening round of the championship.

On 22 February, Dave Foley, Craig Gilroy and Jordi Murphy were called up as injury replacements for Dave Kearney, Mike McCarthy and Seán O'Brien. While Cian Healy and Mike Ross were called up to the squad haven recovered from injury.

On 7 March, Jack O'Donoghue was called up for the final two rounds.

On 20 January, Brunel named a 30-man squad for the 2016 Six Nations Championship.

Head coach:  Jacques Brunel

Call-ups
On 23 January, Davide Giazzon was a late addition to the original 30-man squad.

On 8 February, Robert Barbieri and Andrea Buondonno were called up to the squad as injury cover for David Odiete and Jacopo Sarto.

On 21 February, Joshua Furno and Luca Morisi were called up to the squad, with Furno joining the squad as injury cover for George Biagi.

On 3 March, Quintin Geldenhuys was drafted into the squad haven recovered from injury pre-championship.

On 6 March, Oliviero Fabiani and Alberto Lucchese added to the squad to face Ireland in Round 4.

On 10 March, Pietro Ceccarelli was named as a travelling replacement, who was later drafted into the match-day squad for Lorenzo Cittadini.

On 17 March, Tommaso Allan returned to the squad haven recovered from injury pre-championship.

On 19 January, head coach Vern Cotter named a 35-man squad for the 2016 Six Nations Championship. In addition to the 35-man squad, injured players Grant Gilchrist and Henry Pyrgos will train with the squad.

Head Coach:  Vern Cotter

Call-ups
On 25 January, Alex Allan and Hamish Watson were late additions to the squad ahead of the championship.

On 22 February, Rob Harley, Grayson Hart, George Turner and Ryan Wilson were called up to the squad as injury cover for Alex Allan, Blair Cowan, Chris Fusaro, Pat MacArthur and Sean Maitland.

On 7 March, Fraser Brown and Henry Pyrgos joined the squad ahead of the French fixture in round 4.

On 19 January, Warren Gatland named a 37-man squad for the 2016 Six Nations Championship.

Head Coach:  Warren Gatland

‡ – Denotes dual contracted players.

Call-ups
On 7 March, Rhys Webb returned to the national squad haven recovered from injury sustained pre-championship.

‡ – Denotes dual contracted players.

References

2016
2016 Six Nations Championship